Alsu Filyusovna Minazova (born 4 July 1998) is a Russian slalom canoeist of Tatar descent, who has competed at the international level since 2014.

She won two bronze medals at the ICF Canoe Slalom World Championships, earning them in 2019 (K1 team) and 2021 (C1 team).

Minazova competed at the 2020 Summer Olympics in Tokyo where she started in both women's events. She finished 17th in the K1 event and 14th in the C1 event, after being eliminated in the semifinals on both occasions.

World Cup individual podiums

References

External links

Living people
Russian female canoeists
1998 births
Medalists at the ICF Canoe Slalom World Championships
Canoeists at the 2020 Summer Olympics
Olympic canoeists of Russia
Sportspeople from Ufa
Volga Tatars
Tatar sportspeople
Tatar people of Russia